The 2022 CONCACAF W Championship qualification competition, also known as the CONCACAF W Qualifiers, is a women's football tournament that was contested by the senior women's national teams of the member associations of CONCACAF to decide the participating teams of the 2022 CONCACAF W Championship. The qualifying matches took place in February and April 2022. A total of six teams in the qualifying competition advanced to the final tournament, joining Canada and the United States, who received byes as the top ranked teams. The 2022 CONCACAF W Championship will serve as the CONCACAF qualifiers to the 2023 FIFA Women's World Cup in Australia and New Zealand, as well as for the football tournament at the 2024 Summer Olympics in France.

Belize had its first international win and draw, having lost all international matches since its debut back in 2001.

Teams
A total 39 CONCACAF member associations were eligible to enter the qualifying competition, with Canada and the United States having qualified automatically for the final tournament as the top two CONCACAF teams in the FIFA Women's World Rankings of August 2020. Only 30 teams entered the competition.

Notes
Teams in bold qualified for the final tournament.

Notes

Format
The qualifying competition was held in February and April 2022. Teams will be drawn into six groups of five, and played two home and two away matches in a single round-robin format. Should more than thirty CONCACAF member associations have entered, a play-in round will be held prior to the qualifying group stage. However, as 30 teams entered qualifying, this was not necessary. The six group winners will advance to the final tournament.

Tiebreakers
Teams are ranked according to points (3 points for a win, 1 point for a draw, 0 points for a loss). The rankings of teams in each group are determined as follows (regulations Articles 12.3):

If two or more teams are equal on the basis of the above three criteria, their rankings are determined as follows:

Draw
The qualification draw took place on 21 August 2021, 15:00 EDT, in Miami, Florida, United States. The 30 teams were seeded based on the FIFA Women's World Rankings of June 2021 (in parentheses). The top six teams in the ranking were pre-seeded, and automatically allocated to position 1 in order from group A to F. The remaining teams were placed into pots 1 to 4 based on ranking, with each pot containing six teams. Pot 4 contained the two lowest-ranked teams, along with four unranked teams. In the draw, teams were drawn from each pot and placed in order from group A to F. The position teams were drawn into was based on their pot: pot 1 teams were drawn into position 2, pot 2 teams into position 3, pot 3 teams into position 4 and pot 4 teams into position 5.

Notes
 NR: Not ranked

Schedule
Below is the schedule of the 2022 CONCACAF W Championship qualification tournament.

On 8 October 2021, CONCACAF announced the match dates, after the first window of matches was postponed from November 2021 to February 2022 due to impacts associated with the COVID-19 pandemic.

Groups

Group A

Group B

Group C

Group D

Group E

Group F

Goalscorers

Qualified teams
The following eight teams qualified for the final tournament.

1 Bold indicates champions for that year. Italic indicates hosts for that year.

References

External links

Qualification
2022
2022 in women's association football
Women's Championship qualification
February 2022 sports events in North America
April 2022 sports events in North America
Association football events postponed due to the COVID-19 pandemic